Georgia Stevens (born 13 June 1973) is a former English female rugby union player. She represented  at the 2006 Women's Rugby World Cup.

References

1973 births
Living people
England women's international rugby union players
English female rugby union players